Kosciusko County is a county in the U.S. state of Indiana. At the 2020 United States Census, its population was 80,240. The county seat (and only incorporated city) is Warsaw.

The county was organized in 1836. It was named for the Polish general Tadeusz Kościuszko who served in the American Revolutionary War and then returned to Poland. The county seat is named for Warsaw, the capital of Poland.

History
The Indiana State Legislature passed an omnibus county bill on 7 February 1835 that authorized the creation of thirteen counties in northeast Indiana, including Kosciusko. The county government was organized beginning in 1836. The county's boundary lines have remained unchanged since 1835.

Geographical features
Kosciusko County terrain consists of low rolling hills dotted with bodies of water and drainages, with all available area devoted to agriculture or urban development. Its highest point (1025'/312 meters ASL) is a hill NE of Dewart Lake. The Tippecanoe River flows westward through the central part of the county, while the Eel River flows southwestward through the county's SE corner.

Adjacent counties

 Elkhart County - north
 Noble County - northeast
 Whitley County - southeast
 Wabash County - south
 Fulton County - southwest
 Marshall County - west

Major highways

  U.S. Route 30
  Indiana State Road 10
  Indiana State Road 13
  Indiana State Road 14
  Indiana State Road 15
  Indiana State Road 19
  Indiana State Road 25

Lakes

 Banning Lake
 Beaver Dam Lake
 Big Barbee Lake
 Big Chapman Lake
 Carr Lake
 Center Lake
 Dewart Lake
 Diamond Lake
 Fish Lake
 Goose Lake
 Hoffman Lake
 Hill Lake
 Irish Lake
 James Lake
 Kuhn Lake
 Lake Wawasee
 Little Barbee Lake
 Little Chapman Lake
 Loon Lake
 McClures Lake
 Muskellunge Lake
 Palestine Lake
 Papakeechie Lake
 Pike Lake
 Ridinger Lake
 Rock Lake (part)
 Sechrist Lake
 Shoe Lake
 Silver Lake
 Stanton Lake
 Syracuse Lake
 Tippecanoe Lake
 Waubee Lake
 Winona Lake
 Yellow Creek Lake

Protected areas
 Center Lake Wetland Conservation Area
 Edmund and Virginia Ball Nature Preserve
 Pisgah Marsh Nongame Area (part)

City and towns

 Burket
 Claypool
 Etna Green
 Leesburg
 Mentone
 Milford
 North Webster
 Pierceton
 Sidney
 Silver Lake
 Syracuse
 Warsaw (city)
 Winona Lake

Unincorporated communities

 Atwood
 Barbee
 Bayfield
 Beaver Dam
 Bell Rohr Park
 Buttermilk Point
 Cedar Point
 Clunette
 DeFries Landing
 Enchanted Hills
 Forest Glen
 Gravelton
 Hastings
 Highbanks
 Highlands Park
 Island Park
 Kalorama Park
 Kanata Manayunk
 Kinsey
 Lakeside Park
 Lakeview Spring
 Lowman Corner
 Marineland Gardens
 Milford Junction
 Mineral Springs
 Monoquet
 Musquabuck Park
 Oakwood Park
 Osborn Landing
 Oswego
 Packerton
 Palestine
 Pickwick Park
 Potawatomi Park
 Redmon Park
 Sevastopol
 Shady Banks
 South Park
 Stoneburner Landing
 Stony Ridge
 Vawter Park
 Walker Park
 Wawasee
 Wawasee Village
 Wooster
 Yellowbanks

Townships

 Clay
 Etna
 Franklin
 Harrison
 Jackson
 Jefferson
 Lake
 Monroe
 Plain
 Prairie
 Scott
 Seward
 Tippecanoe
 Turkey Creek
 Van Buren
 Washington
 Wayne

Airports
 KASW - Warsaw Municipal Airport
 KC03 - Nappanee Municipal Airport

Climate and weather

Community

Newspapers

 Times-Union
 The Mail-Journal
 The PAPER
 Ink Free News

Radio Stations

 WRSW-AM 1480/99.7 FM (News Now Warsaw)
 WRSW-FM (Classic Hits 107.3 WRSW
 WAWC-FM (Willie 103.5)

Government

The county government is a constitutional body, and is granted specific powers by the Constitution of Indiana, and by the Indiana Code.

County Council: The legislative branch of the county government; controls spending and revenue collection in the county. Representatives, elected to four-year terms from county districts, are responsible for setting salaries, the annual budget, and special spending. The council has limited authority to impose local taxes, in the form of an income and property tax that is subject to state level approval, excise taxes, and service taxes.

Board of Commissioners: The executive body of the county; commissioners are elected countywide to staggered four-year terms. One commissioner serves as president. The commissioners execute the acts legislated by the council, collect revenue, and manage the county government.

Court: The county maintains a small claims court that handles civil cases. The county also maintains a Circuit and Superior Court. The judge on each court is elected to a term of six years and must be a member of the Indiana bar.

County Officials: The county has other elected offices, including sheriff, coroner, auditor, treasurer, recorder, surveyor, and circuit court clerk. The officials are elected countywide to four-year terms. Members elected to county government positions are required to declare party affiliations and to be residents of the county.

Kosciusko County is part of Indiana's 2nd and 3rd congressional districts. It is also part of Indiana Senate districts 9, 13, 17 and 18 and Indiana House of Representatives districts 18, 22 and 23.

Elected officials:

 Kyle Dukes - Sheriff
 Daniel Hampton - Prosecutor
 Susan Engelberth - Assessor
 Michelle Puckett - Auditor
 Ann Torpy - Clerk
 Joetta Mitchell  - County Recorder
 Sue Ann Mitchell - Treasurer
 Cary P. Groninger - Middle District Commissioner
 Robert M. Conley, President - Southern District Commissioner
 Bradford Jackson - Northern District Commissioner
 Tony Ciriello, Certified Death Investigator, Coroner

Kosciusko County is a Republican stronghold in presidential elections. Woodrow Wilson in 1912 and Franklin D. Roosevelt in 1932 are the only two Democratic Party candidates to win the county from 1888 to the present day. Roosevelt is the only Democrat since 1888 to win the county with a majority. The county is very Republican even by the standards of traditionally Republican Indiana. For example, Roosevelt actually lost the county by eight percentage points in 1936 even as he went on to carry 46 states. Further underlining the county's Republican bent, it rejected Lyndon Johnson in 1964 even in the midst of Johnson's 44-state national landslide. Johnson is the last Democrat to manage even 40 percent of the county's vote.

Education

School districts

 Tippecanoe Valley School Corporation
 Triton School Corporation
 Warsaw Community Schools
 Wawasee Community School Corporation
 Whitko Community School Corporation
 Wa-Nee Community Schools

Demographics

As of the 2010 United States Census, there were 77,358 people, 29,197 households, and 20,740 families in the county. The racial makeup of the county was 93.3% white, 0.8% Asian, 0.7% black or African American, 0.3% Native American, 3.4% from other races, and 1.4% from two or more races. Those of Hispanic or Latino origin made up 7.3% of the population. In terms of ancestry, 33.5% were German, 11.5% were Irish, 10.8% were English, and 8.2% were American.

Of the 29,197 households, 33.9% had children under the age of 18 living with them, 56.6% were married couples living together, 9.5% had a female householder with no husband present, 29.0% were non-families, and 23.9% of all households were made up of individuals. The average household size was 2.60 and the average family size was 3.07. The median age was 37.7 years.

The median income for a household in the county was $47,697 and the median income for a family was $56,305. Males had a median income of $44,358 versus $29,320 for females. The per capita income for the county was $24,019. About 7.0% of families and 10.0% of the population were below the poverty line, including 13.5% of those under age 18 and 5.2% of those age 65 or over.

Notable residents
 Ambrose Bierce, Civil War veteran, author, newspaper columnist
 Chris Schenkel, former Sportscaster for ABC Sports. Resided in Leesburg, Indiana.
 Rick Fox, retired NBA player. Resided in Warsaw, Indiana.

See also
 National Register of Historic Places listings in Kosciusko County, Indiana

References

External links
 Kosciusko County
 Kosciusko County Chamber of Commerce
 Kosciusko County Convention and Visitors Bureau

Sources

 
Indiana counties
1836 establishments in Indiana
Populated places established in 1836